Modachur is a panchayat village in Gobichettipalayam taluk in Erode District of Tamil Nadu state, India. It is a suburb of Gobichettipalayam and 36 km from district headquarters Erode. It is located on the southern side of the town of Gobichettipalayam along the SH 81. Modachur has a population of about 6481.

References

Villages in Erode district